The Royal London Hospital for Integrated Medicine (formerly the Royal London Homoeopathic Hospital) is a specialist alternative medicine hospital located in London, England and a part of University College London Hospitals NHS Foundation Trust. It is the largest public sector provider of complementary medicine in Europe. It is based in the Bloomsbury area of Central London, adjacent to Great Ormond Street Hospital.

History

The London Homoeopathic Hospital was established in Golden Square, Soho, in 1849. Frederic Hervey Foster Quin, the first homeopathic physician in England, had been instrumental in the founding of the hospital. It moved to its present site in Great Ormond Street in 1859, the year when Quin took the chair of therapeutics and materia medica in the medical school. The hospital joined the NHS as a teaching hospital becoming the Royal London Homeopathic Hospital by permission of King George VI in 1948. It was brought under the management of the Bloomsbury Health Authority in 1982 and it joined University College London Hospitals NHS Trust (now University College London Hospitals NHS Foundation Trust) in 2002. The hospital was renamed the Royal London Hospital for Integrated Medicine in September 2010 to better reflect its activities.

It stopped providing NHS-funded homeopathic remedies in April 2018.

Services
The Royal London Hospital for Integrated Medicine offers clinical services including complementary cancer treatments, allergy services, acupuncture,  rheumatology, weight loss management, sleep management, musculoskeletal medicine and stress management, and has access to conventional medicine. It has an education department which offers full and part-time courses in complementary medicine for registered health professionals. It is also home to a specialist library for complementary and alternative medicine.

See also
 UCLH/UCL Biomedical Research Centre
 UCL Partners
 Healthcare in London
 List of NHS trusts

References

External links
 University College London Hospitals NHS Foundation Trust
 UCL School of Life & Medical Sciences

University College London Hospitals NHS Foundation Trust
Health in the London Borough of Camden
Buildings and structures in Bloomsbury
Specialist hospitals in England
Homeopathic hospitals in the United Kingdom
NHS hospitals in London